Coursetia dubia is a species of flowering plant in the family Fabaceae. It is found only in Ecuador. Its natural habitats are subtropical or tropical moist montane forests and subtropical or tropical dry shrubland.

References

Robinieae
Flora of Ecuador
Near threatened plants
Taxonomy articles created by Polbot